KT Eridani (Nova Eridani 2009) was a bright nova in the constellation Eridanus that produced an outburst in 2009. It was the first classical nova ever detected in that constellation.  The nova was discovered at 12:52 UT on 25 November 2009 by K. Itagaki at Yamagata, Japan with a 21 cm patrol telescope. At the time of its discovery, it was a magnitude 8.1 object.
The discovery occurred after the nova's peak brightness, but the All Sky Automated Survey system had detected the nova on three earlier occasions, allowing a more complete light curve to be produced.   The peak magnitude, 5.4, was seen at 15:10 UT on 14 November 2009.

A very high temporal resolution light curve, beginning on 13 November 2009, was obtained from images taken by the Solar Mass Ejection Imager on the Coriolis satellite. These observations show that the peak brightness, magnitude 5.42±0.02, occurred at November 14.67±0.04 UT.   The satellite was able to detect the nova until November 27.23±0.04, by which time it had dropped to magnitude 8.3±0.1.  It is classified as a very fast nova, meaning it dimmed rapidly after peak brightness.

On 28 December 2009 (44 days after peak brightness) it was detected as a 0.21 milliJansky source at 5 GHz by the Very Large Array.   In the following weeks its radio brightness increased and it was detected in additional radio bands. On the other end of the electromagnetic spectrum, the Swift satellite was used to look for X-ray emission from KT Eridani starting on 27 November 2009, and the satellite detected it on 24 December 2009.

In the most common nova systems, the white dwarf accretes matter from a main sequence star. The white dwarf in the KT Eridani system has a mass of between 1.15 and 1.25 . However, KT Eri is thought to have a red giant "donor" star transferring material to a white dwarf.   While novae systems with a main sequence donor star typically have orbital periods of a few hours, the orbital period of KT Eri may be as long as 737 days.

See also
 List of novae in the Milky Way galaxy

References

Novae
Eridanus (constellation)
2009 in science
Eridani, KT